Aspilapteryx grypota is a moth of the family Gracillariidae. It is known from South Africa.

The larvae feed on Salix babylonica. They probably mine the leaves of their host plant.

References

Endemic moths of South Africa
Aspilapteryx
Moths of Africa
Moths described in 1914